Geothermal power in Australia was at one time hoped to provide cost effect, renewable power for Australia. There are locations that have been shown to contain hot granites at depth which hold good potential for development of geothermal energy. Exploratory geothermal wells have been drilled to test for the presence of high temperature geothermal reservoir rocks and such hot granites were detected. However, all these projects have since been abandoned.  A small geothermal plant in Queensland experienced problems during commissioning and as at May 2022, remains idle.

Exploration
Exploration involves finding vast blocks of "hot rocks" with fracture systems that could generate electricity through water being injected, circulated through the fractures, and being returned to surface as steam which could then be used to rotate steam turbines.

There are vast deep-seated granite systems in Central Australia that have high temperatures at depth and these have been drilled by companies such as Panax Geothermal, Geodynamics Ltd, Petratherm, Green Rock Energy and Pacific Hydro to depths of more than four kilometres.  

South Australia has been described as "Australia's hot rock haven" and this renewable energy was hoped to provide an estimated 6.8% of Australia's base load power needs by 2030.

Parts of central Tasmania have been identified by KUTh Energy as having the potential to generate up to 280MW of power.  Such a resource would be able to supply 25% of Tasmania's electricity needs.

However, these projects have been discontinued.

Projects
In 2010, 47 projects were identified in Australia.  Of the larger projects, Geodynamics Cooper Basin demonstration plant managed to progress the furthest. As at May 2022, no geothermal power plants are operating in Australia.

Geodynamics Cooper Basin Demonstration Plant, South Australia
A Cooper Basin demonstration project to assess the potential of hot-rock geothermal energy for zero-emission, base-load power was built by Geodynamics.  The 1 MWe Habanero pilot plant operated for 160 days in 2013 and prior to closure of the trial, the plant was operating at 19kg/s and 215 degrees celsius production well head temperature. However, the project was abandoned after being assessed as uneconomic due to a combination of the cost of commercialising generation and the remoteness of the site.

"The technology worked but unfortunately the cost of implementing the technology and also the cost of delivering the electricity that was produced to a market was just greater than the revenue stream that we could create," Geodynamics chief executive Chris Murray said.  Geodynamics wells have been plugged and remediated.

Geodynamics is no longer exploring geothermal power and is instead looking at other green energy initiatives.  It has therefore changed its name to ReNu Energy and changed its ASX code to RNE.

gTET Winton, Queensland 
A small 310kW geothermal power generation plant commenced commissioning in 2019 with the promise of becoming Australia's only operating geothermal power station.  The plant was to utilise 86oC bore water from existing bores to produce electricity using an Organic Rankine Cycle.  However, commissioning problems were not overcome and as at May 2022, the plant remains idle and the subject of legal dispute.

See also

 Geothermal desalination
 Renewable energy in Australia
 Australian Renewable Energy Agency
 Wind power in Australia
 Solar power in Australia
 Biofuel in Australia
 Renewable energy by country

References

External links

Geodynamics says it has 'hottest rocks on earth' in Cooper Basin
Hot rock energy
Centre to study geothermal energy at Univ of Adelaide
Primary Industries and Resources SA - Geothermal Energy
$3m For SA Geothermal Energy Project

Geothermal energy in Australia